The A4216 is a main road in Swansea, Wales.

Route
The road links Sketty with Gendros.  It begins at the junction at the bottom of Sketty Lane with Mumbles Road.  It continues up Sketty Lane, onto Sketty Park Road then bears right onto Dillwyn Road to the junction with the A4118 (Gower Road) at Sketty Cross.  It continues through this road then up Vivian Road past Tycoch.  The A4216 then continues along Cockett Road past Cwm Gwyn and through Cockett.  The final stretch of the A4216 is Station Road where the A4216 forms a cross roads with the A483 (Carmarthen Road).

Dual carriageway 
The only dual carriageway section is along Sketty Lane.

References

Transport in Swansea
Roads in Wales